Jack Steven (born 28 March 1990) is a former Australian rules footballer who played for the St Kilda and Geelong Football Clubs in the Australian Football League (AFL). During his time at St Kilda, where he played 183 games, Steven won the club's best and fairest award four times. At the peak of his career, from 2015 through 2018, Steven polled double-figure votes in the Brownlow Medal in each season, highlighting his consistency and value to the Saints' midfield.

AFL career

Originally from the Lorne Football Club, he attended Northfield Grammar. Steven was recruited from the Geelong Falcons with pick 42 in the 2007 AFL Draft. Steven kicked the final goal of the 2008 NAB Cup quarter final – a competition which St Kilda went on to win, although Steven did not play in the final.

It was his only AFL game for the year, but he played eight more in 2010.

In January 2011, Steven, along with three teammates, was suspended for six weeks and fined after breaking team rules involving alcohol, prescription medicine and leaving the team hotel while on a team camp in New Zealand. In Round 10, 2011, Steven was nominated for the 2011 AFL Rising Star.

During 2013 Steven established himself as one of the AFL's most elite emerging young midfielders. His explosive pace and ferociousness at the contest culminated in a career best season in which he won the 2013 Trevor Barker Award for St Kilda's best and fairest player.

In March 2015, Steven signed a new contract with the Saints, committing to the club until the end of the 2020 season. Steven played in all 22 games for St Kilda in 2015, averaging 27 disposals and kicking 9 goals. He was awarded his second Trevor Barker medal, finishing with 175 votes.

Steven was inducted into St Kilda's leadership group prior to the 2016 AFL season. He won his second successive Trevor Barker Award and third overall.

In February 2019, Steven took an indefinite leave from football to deal with mental health problems. and returned to the club the following month. He featured in four of the club's first six games of the season, but left the club again in May to continue to take care of his mental health, before returning the following month.

The trade was completed on 16 October, the last day of the trade period. Without having played a game for Geelong, Steven made headlines in May 2020 after suffering what was reported as a "non-life threatening" stabwound to the chest.

Steven announced his retirement in November 2020, despite having one season remaining on his contract.

Statistics
Statistics are correct to the end of the 2020 season

|- style="background:#EAEAEA"
| scope="row" text-align:center | 2008
| 
| 34 || 0 || — || — || — || — || — || — || — || — || — || — || — || — || — || — || 0
|-
| scope="row" text-align:center | 2009
| 
| 34 || 1 || 1 || 0 || 10 || 4 || 14 || 5 || 4 || 1.0 || 0.0 || 10.0 || 4.0 || 14.0 || 5.0 || 4.0 || 0
|- style="background:#EAEAEA"
| scope="row" text-align:center | 2010
| 
| 3 || 8 || 10 || 2 || 50 || 40 || 90 || 21 || 31 || 1.3 || 0.3 || 6.3 || 5.0 || 11.3 || 2.6 || 3.9 || 0
|-
| scope="row" text-align:center | 2011
| 
| 3 || 21 || 13 || 10 || 228 || 183 || 411 || 78 || 84 || 0.6 || 0.5 || 10.9 || 8.7 || 19.6 || 3.7 || 4.0 || 3
|- style="background:#EAEAEA"
| scope="row" text-align:center | 2012
| 
| 3 || 21 || 17 || 9 || 250 || 175 || 425 || 78 || 84 || 0.8 || 0.4 || 11.9 || 8.3 || 20.2 || 3.7 || 4.0 || 1
|-
| scope="row" text-align:center | 2013
| 
| 3 || 22 || 16 || 8 || 312 || 279 || 591 || 83 || 87 || 0.7 || 0.4 || 14.2 || 12.7 || 26.9 || 3.8 || 4.0 || 8
|- style="background:#EAEAEA"
| scope="row" text-align:center | 2014
| 
| 3 || 17 || 8 || 10 || 206 || 187 || 393 || 44 || 79 || 0.5 || 0.6 || 12.1 || 11.0 || 23.1 || 2.6 || 4.6 || 1
|-
| scope="row" text-align:center | 2015
| 
| 3 || 22 || 9 || 15 || 343 || 248 || 591 || 98 || 151 || 0.4 || 0.7 || 15.6 || 11.3 || 26.9 || 4.5 || 6.9 || 12
|- style="background:#EAEAEA"
| scope="row" text-align:center | 2016
| 
| 3 || 22 || 14 || 6 || 310 || 305 || 615 || 62 || 123 || 0.6 || 0.3 || 14.1 || 13.9 || 28.0 || 2.8 || 5.6 || 16
|-
| scope="row" text-align:center | 2017
| 
| 3 || 20 || 6 || 15 || 259 || 267 || 526 || 55 || 93 || 0.3 || 0.8 || 13.0 || 13.4 || 26.3 || 2.8 || 4.7 || 11
|- style="background:#EAEAEA"
| scope="row" text-align:center | 2018
| 
| 3 || 22 || 13 || 7 || 305 || 288 || 593 || 88 || 78 || 0.6 || 0.3 || 13.9 || 13.1 || 27.0 || 4.0 || 3.5 || 18
|-
| scope="row" text-align:center | 2019
| 
| 3 || 7 || 5 || 4 || 78 || 55 || 84 || 8 || 17 || 0.3 || 0.8 || 13.0 || 8.0 || 19.0 || 2.0 || 4.3 || 3
|- style="background:#EAEAEA"
| scope="row" text-align:center | 2020
| 
| 9 || 9 || 1 || 2 || 84 || 64 || 148 || 33 || 35 || 0.1 || 0.2 || 9.3 || 7.1 || 16.4 || 3.7 || 3.9 || 0
|- class="sortbottom"
! colspan=3 | Career
! 192
! 113
! 88
! 2435
! 2095
! 4530
! 664
! 872
! 0.6
! 0.5
! 12.7
! 10.9
! 23.6
! 3.5
! 4.5
! 73
|}

Notes

Honours and achievements
Individual
 4× Trevor Barker Award: 2013, 2015, 2016, 2018
 AFL Rising Star nominee: 2011

References

External links

 

St Kilda Football Club players
Living people
1990 births
Australian rules footballers from Victoria (Australia)
Geelong Falcons players
Trevor Barker Award winners
Sandringham Football Club players
Geelong Football Club players